Montlaur is a railway station in Montlaur, Haute-Garonne, Occitanie, southern France. Within TER Occitanie, it is part of line 10 (Toulouse–Narbonne).

References

Railway stations in Haute-Garonne